Bruno Wolke (4 May 1904 - 23 December 1973) was a German professional road bicycle racer. Wolke was born in Neukölln. He is best remembered for his bronze medal in the Elite race of the 1928 Road World Championships.  He died, aged 69, in Rottenburg.

Palmares 

1927
 1st, Stage 7, Deutschland Tour
1928 - Mifa
 1st, Breslau Rundfahrt
  World Road Race Championship
 3rd, National Road Race Championship
1930 - Mifa

References

1904 births
1973 deaths
German male cyclists
Cyclists from Berlin
People from Neukölln